Mihaela Buzărnescu was the defending champion, but chose not to participate.

Viktorija Golubic won the title, defeating Natalia Vikhlyantseva in the final, 3–6, 6–1, 7–5.

Seeds

Draw

Finals

Top half

Bottom half

References
Main Draw

Internationaux Féminins de la Vienne - Singles